Marie-Hélène Schwartz (1913 – 5 January 2013) was a French mathematician, known for her work on characteristic numbers of spaces with singularities.

Education and career
Born Marie-Hélène Lévy, she was the daughter of mathematician Paul Lévy and the great-granddaughter of philologist Henri Weil. After studying at the Lycée Janson-de-Sailly, she began studies at the École Normale Supérieure in 1934, but contracted tuberculosis which forced her to drop out. She married another Jewish mathematician, Laurent Schwartz, in 1938, and soon went into hiding while the Nazis occupied France. After the war, she taught at the University of Reims Champagne-Ardenne and finished a thesis on generalizations of the Gauss–Bonnet formula in 1953. In 1964, she moved to the University of Lille, where she retired in 1981.

Recognition
A conference was held in her honor in Lille in 1986, and a day of lectures in Paris honored her 80th birthday in 1993, during which she presented a two-hour talk herself. She continued publishing mathematical research into her late 80s.

References

1913 births
2013 deaths
20th-century French Jews
French mathematicians
French women mathematicians
20th-century French women scientists